The State Register of Heritage Places is maintained by the Heritage Council of Western Australia. , 95 places are heritage-listed in the Shire of Beverley, of which 18 are on the State Register of Heritage Places.

List
The Western Australian State Register of Heritage Places, lists the following 18 state registered places within the Shire of Beverley:

Notes

 No coordinates specified by Inherit database

References

Beverley
 
Beverley